Hongqiao is a town in Jiang'an County in southeastern Sichuan province, China, located  southeast of downtown Yibin. , it has 2 residential communities (社区) and 15 villages under its administration.

References 

Township-level divisions of Sichuan